Mozart Ice Piedmont is an ice piedmont, 60 nautical miles (110 km) long-running in a NW-SE direction and 15 nautical miles (28 km) wide in its widest part, on the west coast of Alexander Island, Antarctica. Mapped from air photos taken by the Ronne Antarctic Research Expedition (RARE) in 1947, by Searle of the Falkland Islands Dependencies Survey (FIDS) in 1960. Named by the United Kingdom Antarctic Place-Names Committee (UK-APC) for Wolfgang Amadeus Mozart (1756–1791), famous Austrian composer. Some landforms within this area are named in association with the Mozart Ice Piedmont such as Figaro Nunatak, along with a few other landforms.

See also 

 Bongrain Ice Piedmont
 Handel Ice Piedmont

Further reading 
 M. Braun, A. Humbert, and A. Moll, Changes of Wilkins Ice Shelf over the past 15 years and inferences on its stability, The Cryosphere, 3, 41–56, 2009  www.the-cryosphere.net/3/41/2009/

External links 

 Mozart Ice Piedmont on USGS website
 Mozart Ice Piedmont on SCAR website
 Mozart Ice Piedmont on geographic.org

References 

Cultural depictions of Wolfgang Amadeus Mozart
Ice piedmonts of Palmer Land
Bodies of ice of Alexander Island